Alexander McNutt may refer to:

Alexander McNutt (colonist) (1725–1811), Ulsterman; Nova Scotia colonizer, land agent and British army officer
Alexander McNutt (governor) (1802–1848), American; Governor of Mississippi
Alexander McNutt v. Richard J Bland from List of United States Supreme Court cases, volume 43